Alexander  Tsaturyan (March 28, 1865 in Zakatala – March 31, 1917 in Tiflis) was an Armenian poet and translator.

References 

Alexander Tsaturyan's biography

19th-century Armenian poets
1865 births
1917 deaths
People from Zaqatala
Armenian translators
Burials at Armenian Pantheon of Tbilisi
19th-century translators
Armenian male poets
19th-century male writers
20th-century Armenian poets
20th-century male writers